This is a list of years in Iraq, referring to the Iraqi Republic (1958-1963), Baathist Iraq (1963-2003) and Arab Republic of Iraq (2003–present).

21st century

20th century

See also
History of Iraq
List of years by country
Timeline of Baghdad
Timeline of Basra
Timeline of Mosul

 
Iraq-related lists
Iraq